The Israel Diamond Institute (IDI) Group of Companies is a non-profit, public interest company that represents all organizations and institutions involved in Israel’s diamond industry. The main functions of the Institute are marketing and business development, promotion of rough diamond trading, professional training, security consultancy, technological research and development and trade shows.

Activities 

Established in 1967, the IDI’s goal is to promote the Israeli diamond industry worldwide.

The IDI Group is active in a variety of areas, including: marketing and PR on behalf of the Israeli diamond industry, professional training for diamantaires, online commerce, regulatory issues, and security consulting.

The IDI Group is responsible for strengthening the ties between the Israeli diamond community and the global diamond industry, expanding relationships with international diamond buyers and increasing exports and sales abroad. The IDI collaborates with some of the largest online retailers in the global industry, including James Allen and Blue Nile.

The IDI takes part regularly in all major international diamond and jewelry shows, where it organizes a large Israeli pavilion that hosts local diamond companies with the aim of promoting the Israeli diamond industry as a whole.

The IDI Group operates a website in both English and Hebrew that features industry-related news and information, as well as B2B services and products based on a large, comprehensive database.

The IDI also manages the Technological Institute, a wholly-owned IDI subsidiary. The Technological Institute invests in the development of new technologies that improve and upgrade the volume and quality of polished diamonds in Israel. The Technological Institute manages all stages of planning and implementation in R&D projects, in collaboration with academic institutions and private companies. The Technological Institute also functions as a polishing factory, enabling cutters and polishers to rent work stations, with the aim of promoting diamond manufacturing in Israel and cut costs for the local community of diamantaires.

Harry Oppenheimer Diamond Museum 

The IDI also operated the Harry Oppenheimer Diamond Museum for 31 years until it closed in 2018. The museum introduced the public to the achievements of the Israeli diamond industry and hosted an interactive diamond experience that blended the fields of science, art and industry. The museum was located in Ramat Gan.

See also 
Economy of Israel

References

External links 
 Official website
 Economy Updates from Ynetnews

Diamond industry in Israel
Trade associations based in Israel
 Non-profit organizations based in Israel